The Plaxton Prestige is a low-floor single-decker bus body built by Plaxton at the Wigan, England factory of its Northern Counties subsidiary, and at its main Scarborough, North Yorkshire factory, during the latter half of the 1990s.

The Prestige was mostly built on DAF SB220 chassis, although small numbers were built on Volvo B10BLE chassis. Several of the DAF vehicles were LPG-powered; gas tanks were located on the roof. Arriva was a major purchaser of the Prestige, with a number for Transport for London and for provincial areas, all on DAF chassis. It was only a short-term affair, however, being in favour of its sister, the Pointer.

In Plaxton's body numbering system, the letter H identified the Prestige, although not all Prestiges received a Plaxton body number (early examples being numbered in the Northern Counties series).

At one stage, the Prestige was provisionally given the name Paladin LF. Northern Counties' contemporary step-entrance single-decker bus body was the Paladin, and LF would have stood for low floor. However, the name Prestige (which had earlier been briefly used for an export variant of the Plaxton Excalibur) was given to the model instead.

Gallery

See also 
 List of buses

References
 Millar, Alan (2007) Bus & Coach Recognition : Ian Allan Ltd.,

External links

Prestige
Buses of the United Kingdom
Low-floor buses
Single-deck buses